Trentham Memorial Park is a large park and a major sport and recreation ground in Trentham, a suburb of Upper Hutt, in the Wellington region of New Zealand.

 It is described by the local council as an attractive setting for sports, carnivals, picnics, playgrounds and bush walks, and lies between Fergusson Drive and the Hutt River.

There is a range of sporting pursuits available in the park including rugby, football, cricket, harriers and an axeman's club.

The park includes:
 Barton's Bush – a native forest reserve
 Domain Bush - a smaller native forest remnant
 Walking tracks
 Barton Oval – a formal cricket oval
 Indoor and outdoor cricket nets

 Sports grounds for cricket and rugby
 Clubrooms
 Children's playground
 Car park
 Open space to hold concerts, carnivals and public displays, (such as fireworks and car shows)

References

Upper Hutt
Sports venues in Upper Hutt
Parks in the Wellington Region